Horace Griggs Prall (March 6, 1881April 23, 1951) was a New Jersey attorney and Republican politician. He served for a number of years as a state legislator and a short term as acting governor of New Jersey in 1935.

Prall was born near Ringoes in East Amwell Township, New Jersey. He attended Harvard University (1906) and New York University School of Law (LL.B. 1908). After almost two decades of practicing law, Prall was elected to the legislature, first to the Assembly (1927–28), then to the State Senate (1928–36), serving as president of that body in his last two years of tenure. After the resignation of Governor A. Harry Moore, Prall served as Acting Governor for a brief period (January 3, 1935 – January 15, 1935). After completing his last term as a Senator, Prall became a judge on the Court of Common Pleas.

A resident of Lambertville, New Jersey, he died of a heart attack at the age of 70 on April 23, 1951, in Trenton, New Jersey.

References

Sources
Biography from the National Governors Association

1881 births
1951 deaths
Republican Party governors of New Jersey
Republican Party New Jersey state senators
New Jersey state court judges
Republican Party members of the New Jersey General Assembly
New Jersey lawyers
Harvard University alumni
New York University School of Law alumni
People from East Amwell Township, New Jersey
People from Lambertville, New Jersey
Presidents of the New Jersey Senate
20th-century American judges
20th-century American politicians
20th-century American lawyers